The .20 BR is a centerfire wildcat rifle cartridge. The cartridge features a short fat case which is reputed to be both efficient and accurate.

The inherent accuracy of the BR case design and the high performance of the .20 BR has led to it being adopted by varmint hunters and target shooters.

Advantages of this cartridge include; its ability to be chambered in any rifle action which has the .308 Winchester sized bolt face; its short length enables action makers to utilise shorter ports to increase rigidity; and cases are easily formed and loaded.

See also
 .20 Tactical
 .204 Ruger
 .20 Ferguson Ace
 5 mm/35 SMc
 5 mm caliber
 List of rifle cartridges

References 

Pistol and rifle cartridges
Wildcat cartridges